Incest is human sexual activity between family members or close relatives. This typically includes sexual activity between people in consanguinity (blood relations), and sometimes those related by affinity (marriage or stepfamily), adoption, or lineage. It is strictly forbidden and considered immoral in most societies, and can lead to an increased risk of genetic disorders in children.

The incest taboo is one of the most widespread of all cultural taboos, both in present and in past societies. Most modern societies have laws regarding incest or social restrictions on closely consanguineous marriages. In societies where it is illegal, consensual adult incest is seen by some as a victimless crime. Some cultures extend the incest taboo to relatives with no consanguinity such as milk-siblings, step-siblings, and adoptive siblings, albeit sometimes with less intensity. Third-degree relatives (such as half-aunt, half-nephew, first cousin) on average have 12.5% common genetic heritage, and sexual relations between them are viewed differently in various cultures, from being discouraged to being socially acceptable. Children of incestuous relationships have been regarded as illegitimate, and are still so regarded in some societies today. In most cases, the parents did not have the option to marry to remove that status, as incestuous marriages were, and are, normally also prohibited.

A common justification for prohibiting incest is avoiding inbreeding: a collection of genetic disorders suffered by the children of parents with a close genetic relationship. Such children are at greater risk of congenital disorders, death and developmental and physical disability, and that risk is proportional to their parents' coefficient of relationship—a measure of how closely the parents are related genetically. However, cultural anthropologists have noted that inbreeding avoidance cannot form the sole basis for the incest taboo because the boundaries of the incest prohibition vary widely between cultures and not necessarily in ways that maximize the avoidance of inbreeding.

In some societies, such as those of Ancient Egypt, brother–sister, father–daughter, mother–son, cousin–cousin, aunt–nephew, uncle–niece and other combinations of relations within a royal family were married as a means of perpetuating the royal lineage. Some societies have different views about what constitutes illegal or immoral incest. For example, in Samoa, marriage between a brother and an older sister was allowed, while marriage between a brother and a younger sister was declared as unethical. However sexual relations with a first-degree relative (meaning a parent, sibling or child) are almost universally forbidden.

Terminology

The English word incest is derived from the Latin incestus, which has a general meaning of "impure, unchaste".
It was introduced into Middle English, both in the generic Latin sense (preserved throughout the Middle English period) and in the narrow modern sense.
The derived adjective incestuous appears in the 16th century.
Before the Latin term came in, incest was known in Old English as sib-leger (from sibb 'kinship' + leger 'to lie') or mǣġhǣmed (from mǣġ 'kin, parent' + hǣmed 'sexual intercourse') but in time, both words fell out of use. Terms like incester and incestual have been used to describe those interested or involved in sexual relations with relatives among humans, while inbreeder has been used in relation to similar behavior among non-human animals or organisms.

History

Antiquity
In ancient China, first cousins with the same surnames (i.e. those born to the father's brothers) were not permitted to marry, while those with different surnames could marry (i.e. maternal cousins and paternal cousins born to the father's sisters).

Several of the Egyptian Kings married their sisters and had several children with them to continue the royal bloodline. For example Tutankhamun married his half-sister Ankhesenamun and was himself the child of an incestuous union between Akhenaten and an unidentified sister-wife. Several scholars, such as Frier et al., state that sibling marriages were widespread among all classes in Egypt during the Graeco-Roman period. Numerous papyri and the Roman census declarations attest to many husbands and wives being brother and sister, of the same father and mother. However it has also been argued that available evidence does not support the view that such relations were common.

The most famous of these relationships were in the Ptolemaic royal family; Cleopatra VII was married to two of her younger brothers, Ptolemy XIII and Ptolemy XIV, whilst her mother and father, Cleopatra V and Ptolemy XII, were also brother and sister. Arsinoe II and her younger brother, Ptolemy II Philadelphus, were the first in the family to participate in a full-sibling marriage, a departure from custom. A union between children of the same parents was very common in both Greek and Macedonian tradition so it evidently caused some degree of astonishment: the Alexandrian poet Sotades was put to death for criticizing the "wicked" nature of the marriage, while his contemporary Theokritos more politically compared it to the relationship of Zeus with his older sister, Hera. Ptolemy and his sister-wife, Arsinoe, put emphasis on their incestuous union through their mutual adoption of the epithet Philadelphos ("Sibling-Lover"). They were the first full-sibling royal couple in the kingdom's known history to produce a child, Ptolemy V, and for the subsequent century and more the Ptolemies participated in full-sibling unions wherever possible.

It may have been observation of their next-door Ptolemaic competitors that guided the Seleukids to their own experimentations with sibling unions. The daughter of Antiochus III and Laodice III, Laodice IV, married her two full-blooded older brothers, Antiochus and Seleucus IV, and also her younger brother, Antiochus IV. Her second and third brother-husbands ruled as king one after the other, making her the queen in both her marriages. She bore children to all three of her brothers from her union with them. One of them was her son, Demetrius I, who also took the throne at one point and married a full-sister of his own, Laodice V. Laodice V bore her brother-husband three children, and their marriage is the last known sibling marriage in the kingdom's history.

There are records of brother-sister unions in some of the smaller kingdoms of the Hellenistic era, though none of them seems to have pursued it with the zeal and resolve of the Ptolemies. The Pontic and Kommagenian kingdoms had full-sibling unions in a few ages. Mithridates IV of Pontus married his sister Laodice; the couple adopted the double epithet "Philadelphoi", which they publicized on their coinage, where, as Ptolemy II and Arsinoe II, they were depicted in jugate coinage, with the likeness of Hera and Zeus on the back. Mithridates VI Eupator also wed a sister called Laodice. In Commagane the later pro-Roman King Antiochus III Philokaisar wed his sister Iotapa, the couple procreated themselves exactly, producing their son, Antiochus IV Epiphanes, and their daughter, Iotapa, who would unite with him and also adopt the epithet "Philadelphos".

The fable of Oedipus, with a theme of inadvertent incest between a mother and son, ends in disaster and shows ancient taboos against incest, since Oedipus blinds himself in disgust and shame after his incestuous actions. In the ‘sequel’ to Oedipus, Antigone, his four children are also punished for their parents' incestuousness. Incest appears in the commonly accepted version of the birth of Adonis, when his mother, Myrrha, has sex with her father, Cinyras, during a festival, disguised as a prostitute.

In ancient Greece, Spartan King Leonidas I, hero of the legendary Battle of Thermopylae, was married to his niece Gorgo, daughter of his half-brother Cleomenes I. Greek law allowed marriage between a brother and sister if they had different mothers. For example, some accounts say that Elpinice was for a time married to her half-brother Cimon.

Incest was sometimes acknowledged as a positive sign of tyranny in ancient Greece. Herodotus recounts a dream of Hippias, son of Pisistratus, in which he "slept with his own mother," and this dream gave him assurance that he would regain power over Athens. Suetonius attributes this omen to a dream of Julius Caesar, explaining the symbolism of dreaming of sexual intercourse with one's own mother.

Incest is mentioned and condemned in Virgil's Aeneid Book VI: hic thalamum invasit natae vetitosque hymenaeos; "This one invaded a daughter's room and a forbidden sex act".

Roman civil law prohibited marriages within four degrees of consanguinity but had no degrees of affinity with regards to marriage. Roman civil laws prohibited any marriage between parents and children, either in the ascending or descending line ad infinitum. Adoption was considered the same as affinity in that an adoptive father could not marry an unemancipated daughter or granddaughter even if the adoption had been dissolved. Incestuous unions were discouraged and considered nefas (against the laws of gods and man) in ancient Rome. In AD 295 incest was explicitly forbidden by an imperial edict, which divided the concept of incestus into two categories of unequal gravity: the incestus iuris gentium, which was applied to both Romans and non-Romans in the Empire, and the incestus iuris civilis, which concerned only Roman citizens. Therefore, for example, an Egyptian could marry an aunt, but a Roman could not. Despite the act of incest being unacceptable within the Roman Empire, Roman Emperor Caligula is rumored to have had sexual relationships with all three of his sisters (Julia Livilla, Drusilla, and Agrippina the Younger). Emperor Claudius, after executing his previous wife, married his brother's daughter Agrippina the Younger, and changed the law to allow an otherwise illegal union. The law prohibiting marrying a sister's daughter remained. The taboo against incest in ancient Rome is demonstrated by the fact that politicians would use charges of incest (often false charges) as insults and means of political disenfranchisement.

During the first two centuries A.D., in Roman Egypt, full sibling marriage occurred with some frequency among commoners as both Egyptians and Romans announced weddings that have been between full-siblings. This is the only evidence for brother-sister marriage among commoners in any society.

Strabo reported that the Persian magi and the Irish had sex with their own mothers. Ctesias' History of Persia mentions how some Macedonians who saw a performance of Oedipus Tyrannus were perplexed at why Oedipus felt the need to mutilate himself after learning the truth about his birth; they booed the actor, and urged each other "Go for your mother".

In Norse mythology, there are themes of brother-sister marriage, a prominent example being between Njörðr and his unnamed sister (perhaps Nerthus), parents of Freyja and Freyr. Loki in turn also accuses Freyja and Freyr of having a sexual relationship.

Biblical references
The earliest Biblical reference to incest involved Cain. It was cited that he knew his wife and she conceived and bore Enoch. During this period, there was no other woman except Eve or there was an unnamed sister and so this meant Cain had an incestuous relationship with his mother or his sister. According to the Book of Jubilees, Cain married his sister Awan. Later, in Genesis 20 of the Hebrew Bible, the Patriarch Abraham married his half-sister Sarah. Other references include the passage in Samuel where Amnon, King David's son, raped his half-sister, Tamar. According to Michael D. Coogan, it would have been perfectly all right for Amnon to have married her, the Bible being inconsistent about prohibiting incest.

In Genesis 19:30-38, living in an isolated area after the destruction of Sodom and Gomorrah, Lot's two daughters conspired to inebriate and rape their father due to the lack of available partners to continue his line of descent. Because of intoxication, Lot "perceived not" when his firstborn, and the following night his younger, daughter lay with him.

Moses was also born to an incestuous marriage. Exodus 6 detailed how his father Amram was the nephew of his mother Jochebed. An account noted that the incestuous relations did not suffer the fate of childlessness, which was the punishment for such couples in levitical law. It stated, however, that the incest exposed Moses "to the peril of wild beasts, of the weather, of the water, and more."

From the Middle Ages onward

Many European monarchs were related due to political marriages, sometimes resulting in distant cousins – and even first cousins – being married. This was especially true in the Habsburg, Hohenzollern, Savoy, and Bourbon royal houses. However, relations between siblings, which may have been tolerated in other cultures, were considered abhorrent. For example, the false accusation that Anne Boleyn and her brother George Boleyn had committed incest was one of the reasons given for both being executed in May 1536. Historians agree that the false accusation against Anne Boleyn and George Boleyn was trumped up in order to ensure the king could go on to marry Jane Seymour.

Incestuous marriages were also seen in the royal houses of ancient Japan and Korea, Inca Peru, Ancient Hawaii, and, at times, Central Africa, Mexico, and Thailand. Like the kings of ancient Egypt, the Inca rulers married their sisters. Huayna Capac, for instance, was the son of Topa Inca Yupanqui and the Inca's sister and wife.

The ruling Inca king was expected to marry his full sister. If he had no children by his eldest sister, he married the second and third until they had children. Preservation of the purity of the Sun's blood was one of the reasons for the brother-sister marriage of the Inca king. The Inca kings claimed divine descent from celestial bodies, and emulated the behavior of their celestial ancestor, the Sun, who married his sister, the Moon. Another reason the princes and kings married their sisters was so the heir might inherit the kingdom as much as through his mother as through his father. Therefore, the prince could invoke both principles of inheritance.

Half-sibling marriages were found in ancient Japan such as the marriage of Emperor Bidatsu and his half-sister Empress Suiko. Japanese Prince Kinashi no Karu had sexual relationships with his full sister Princess Karu no Ōiratsume, although the action was regarded as foolish. In order to prevent the influence of the other families, a half-sister of Korean Goryeo dynasty monarch Gwangjong became his wife in the 10th century. Her name was Daemok. Marriage with a family member not related by blood was also regarded as contravening morality and was therefore incest. One example of this is the 14th century Chunghye of Goryeo, who raped one of his deceased father's concubines, who was thus regarded to be his mother.

In India, the largest proportion of women aged 13 to 49 who marry their close relative are in Tamil Nadu, then Andhra Pradesh, Karnataka, and Maharashtra. While it is rare for uncle-niece marriages, it is more common in Andhra Pradesh and Tamil Nadu.

Others
In some Southeast Asian cultures, stories of incest being common among certain ethnicities are sometimes told as expressions of contempt for those ethnicities.

Marriages between younger brothers and their older sisters were common among the early Udege people.

In the Hawaiian Islands, high ali'i chiefs were obligated to marry their older sisters in order to increase their mana. These copulations were thought to maintain the purity of the royal blood. Another reason for these familial unions was to maintain a limited size of the ruling ali'i group. As per the priestly regulations of Kanalu, put in place after multiple disasters, "chiefs must increase their numbers and this can be done if a brother marries his older sister."

Prevalence and statistics
Incest between an adult and a person under the age of consent is considered a form of child sexual abuse that has been shown to be one of the most extreme forms of childhood abuse; it often results in serious and long-term psychological trauma, especially in the case of parental incest. Its prevalence is difficult to generalize, but research has estimated 10–15% of the general population as having at least one such sexual contact, with less than 2% involving intercourse or attempted intercourse. Among women, research has yielded estimates as high as 20%.

Father–daughter incest was for many years the most commonly reported and studied form of incest. More recently, studies have suggested that sibling incest, particularly older brothers having sexual relations with younger siblings, is the most common form of incest, with some studies finding sibling incest occurring more frequently than other forms of incest. Some studies suggest that adolescent perpetrators of sibling abuse choose younger victims, abuse victims over a lengthier period, use violence more frequently and severely than adult perpetrators, and that sibling abuse has a higher rate of penetrative acts than father or stepfather incest, with father and older brother incest resulting in greater reported distress than stepfather incest. South Africa, Saudi Arabia, Sudan, Pakistan and Nigeria are some of the countries with the most incest through consanguineous marriage.

Types

Between adults and children

Sex between an adult family member and a child is usually considered a form of child sexual abuse, also known as child incestuous abuse, and for many years has been the most reported form of incest. Father–daughter and stepfather–stepdaughter sex is the most commonly reported form of adult–child incest, with most of the remaining involving a mother or stepmother. Many studies found that stepfathers tend to be far more likely than biological fathers to engage in this form of incest. One study of adult women in San Francisco estimated that 17% of women were abused by stepfathers and 2% were abused by biological fathers. Father–son incest is reported less often, but it is not known how close the frequency is to heterosexual incest because it is likely more under-reported. Prevalence of incest between parents and their children is difficult to estimate due to secrecy and privacy.

In a 1999 news story, BBC reported, "Close-knit family life in India masks an alarming amount of sexual abuse of children and teenage girls by family members, a new report suggests. Delhi organisation RAHI said 76% of respondents to its survey had been abused when they were children—40% of those by a family member."

According to the National Center for Victims of Crime a large proportion of rape committed in the United States is perpetrated by a family member:

A study of victims of father–daughter incest in the 1970s showed that there were "common features" within families before the occurrence of incest: estrangement between the mother and the daughter, extreme paternal dominance, and reassignment of some of the mother's traditional major family responsibility to the daughter. Oldest and only daughters were more likely to be the victims of incest. It was also stated that the incest experience was psychologically harmful to the woman in later life, frequently leading to feelings of low self-esteem, very unhealthy sexual activity, contempt for other women, and other emotional problems.

Adults who as children were incestuously victimized by adults often suffer from low self-esteem, difficulties in interpersonal relationships, and sexual dysfunction, and are at an extremely high risk of many mental disorders, including depression, anxiety disorders, phobic avoidance reactions, somatoform disorder, substance abuse, borderline personality disorder, and complex post-traumatic stress disorder.

The Goler clan in Nova Scotia is a specific instance in which child sexual abuse in the form of forced adult/child and sibling/sibling incest took place over at least three generations. A number of Goler children were victims of sexual abuse at the hands of fathers, mothers, uncles, aunts, sisters, brothers, cousins, and each other. During interrogation by police, several of the adults openly admitted to engaging in many forms of sexual activity, up to and including full intercourse, multiple times with the children. Sixteen adults (both men and women) were charged with hundreds of allegations of incest and sexual abuse of children as young as five. In July 2012, twelve children were removed from the 'Colt' family (a pseudonym) in New South Wales, Australia, after the discovery of four generations of incest. Child protection workers and psychologists said interviews with the children indicated "a virtual sexual free-for-all".

In Japan, there is a popular misconception that mother–son incestuous contact is common, due to the manner in which it is depicted in the press and popular media. According to Hideo Tokuoka, "When Americans think of incest, they think of fathers and daughters; in Japan one thinks of mothers and sons" due to the extensive media coverage of mother–son incest there. Some western researchers assumed that mother–son incest is common in Japan, but research into victimization statistics from police and health-care systems discredits this; it shows that the vast majority of sexual abuse, including incest, in Japan is perpetrated by men against young girls.

While incest between adults and children generally involves the adult as the perpetrator of abuse, there are rare instances of sons sexually assaulting their mothers. These sons are typically mid-adolescent to young adult, and, unlike parent-initiated incest, the incidents involve some kind of physical force. Although the mothers may be accused of being seductive with their sons and inviting the sexual contact, this is contrary to evidence. Such accusations can parallel other forms of rape, where, due to victim blaming, a woman is accused of being at fault for the rape. In some cases, mother–son incest is best classified as acquaintance rape of the mother by the adolescent son.

Between children
Childhood sibling–sibling incest is considered to be widespread but rarely reported. Sibling–sibling incest becomes child-on-child sexual abuse when it occurs without consent, without equality, or as a result of coercion. In this form, it is believed to be the most common form of intrafamilial abuse. The most commonly reported form of abusive sibling incest is abuse of a younger sibling by an older sibling. A 2006 study showed a large portion of adults who experienced sibling incest abuse have "distorted" or "disturbed" beliefs (such as that the act was "normal") both about their own experience and the subject of sexual abuse in general.

Sibling abusive incest is most prevalent in families where one or both parents are often absent or emotionally unavailable, with the abusive siblings using incest as a way to assert their power over a weaker sibling. Absence of the father in particular has been found to be a significant element of most cases of sexual abuse of female children by a brother. The damaging effects on both childhood development and adult symptoms resulting from brother–sister sexual abuse are similar to the effects of father–daughter, including substance abuse, depression, suicidality, and eating disorders.

Between adults
Proponents of incest between consenting adults draw clear boundaries between the behavior of consenting adults on one hand and rape, child molestation, and abusive incest on the other. However, even consensual relationships such as these are still legally classified as incest, and criminalized in many jurisdictions (although there are certain exceptions). James Roffee, a senior lecturer in criminology at Monash University and former worker on legal responses to familial sexual activity in England and Wales, and Scotland, discussed how the European Convention on Human Rights deems all familial sexual acts to be criminal, even if all parties give their full consent and are knowledgeable to all possible consequences. He also argues that the use of particular language tools in the legislation manipulates the reader to deem all familial sexual activities as immoral and criminal, even if all parties are consenting adults.

In Slate, William Saletan drew a legal connection between gay sex and incest between consenting adults. As he described in his article, in 2003, U.S. Senator Rick Santorum commented on a pending U.S. Supreme Court case involving sodomy laws (primarily as a matter of constitutional rights to privacy and equal protection under the law):

Saletan argued that, legally and morally, there is essentially no difference between the two, and went on to support incest between consenting adults being covered by a legal right to privacy. UCLA law professor Eugene Volokh has made similar arguments. In a more recent article, Saletan said that incest is wrong because it introduces the possibility of irreparably damaging family units by introducing "a notoriously incendiary dynamic—sexual tension—into the mix".

Aunts, uncles, nieces or nephews

In the Netherlands, marrying one's nephew or niece is legal, but only with the explicit permission of the Dutch Government, due to the possible risk of genetic defects among the offspring. Nephew-niece marriages predominantly occur among foreign immigrants. In November 2008, the Christian Democratic (CDA) party's Scientific Institute announced that it wanted a ban on marriages to nephews and nieces.

Consensual sex between adults (persons of 18 years and older) is always lawful in the Netherlands and Belgium, even among closely related family members. Sexual acts between an adult family member and a minor are illegal, though they are not classified as incest, but as abuse of the authority such an adult has over a minor, comparable to that of a teacher, coach or priest.

In Florida, consensual adult sexual intercourse with someone known to be your aunt, uncle, niece or nephew constitutes a felony of the third degree. Other states also commonly prohibit marriages between such kin. The legality of sex with a half-aunt or half-uncle varies state by state.

In the United Kingdom, incest includes only sexual intercourse with a parent, grandparent, child or sibling, but the more recently introduced offence of "sex with an adult relative" extends also as far as half-siblings, uncles, aunts, nephews and nieces. However, the term 'incest' remains widely used in popular culture to describe any form of sexual activity with a relative. In Canada, marriage between uncles and nieces and between aunts and nephews is legal.

Between adult siblings

The most public case of adult sibling incest in recent years is the case of a brother-sister couple from Germany, Patrick Stübing and Susan Karolewski. Because of violent behavior on the part of his father, Patrick was taken in at the age of 3 by foster parents, who adopted him later. At the age of 23 he learned about his biological parents, contacted his mother, and met her and his then 16-year-old sister Susan for the first time. The now-adult Patrick moved in with his birth family shortly thereafter. After their mother died suddenly six months later, the siblings became intimately close, and had their first child together in 2001. By 2004, they had four children together: Eric, Sarah, Nancy, and Sofia. The public nature of their relationship, and the repeated prosecutions and even jail time they have served as a result, has caused some in Germany to question whether incest between consenting adults should be punished at all. An article about them in Der Spiegel states that the couple are happy together. According to court records, the first three children have mental and physical disabilities, and have been placed in foster care. In April 2012, at the European Court of Human Rights, Patrick Stübing lost his case that the conviction violated his right to a private and family life. On 24 September 2014, the German Ethics Council recommended that the government abolish laws criminalizing incest between siblings, arguing that such bans impinge upon citizens.

Some societies differentiate between full sibling and half sibling relations.

Cousin relationships

Marriages and sexual relationships between first cousins are stigmatized as incest in some cultures, but tolerated in much of the world. Currently, 24 US states prohibit marriages between first cousins, and another seven permit them only under special circumstances.
The United Kingdom permits both marriage and sexual relations between first cousins.

In some non-Western societies, marriages between close biological relatives account for 20% to 60% of all marriages.

First- and second-cousin marriages are rare, accounting for less than 1% of marriages in Western Europe, North America and Oceania, while reaching 9% in South America, East Asia and South Europe and about 50% in regions of the Middle East, North Africa and South Asia. Communities such as the Dhond and the Bhittani of Pakistan clearly prefer marriages between cousins as belief they ensure purity of the descent line, provide intimate knowledge of the spouses, and ensure that patrimony will not pass into the hands of "outsiders". Cross-cousin marriages are preferred among the Yanomami of Brazilian Amazonia, among many other tribal societies identified by anthropologists.

There are some cultures in Asia which stigmatize cousin marriage, in some instances even marriages between second cousins or more remotely related people. This is notably true in the culture of Korea. In South Korea, before 1997, anyone with the same last name and clan were prohibited from marriage. In light of this law being held unconstitutional, South Korea now only prohibits up to third cousins (see Article 809 of the Korean Civil Code). Hmong culture prohibits the marriage of anyone with the same last name – to do so would result in being shunned by the entire community, and they are usually stripped of their last name.

In a review of 48 studies on the children parented by cousins, the rate of birth defects was twice that of non-related couples: 4% for cousin couples as opposed to 2% for the general population.

Defined through marriage
Some cultures include relatives by marriage in incest prohibitions; these relationships are called affinity rather than consanguinity. For example, the question of the legality and morality of a widower who wished to marry his deceased wife's sister was the subject of long and fierce debate in the United Kingdom in the 19th century, involving, among others, Matthew Boulton and Charles La Trobe. The marriages were entered into in Scotland and Switzerland respectively, where they were legal. In medieval Europe, standing as a godparent to a child also created a bond of affinity. But in other societies, a deceased spouse's sibling was considered the ideal person to marry. The Hebrew Bible forbids a man from marrying his brother's widow with the exception that, if his brother died childless, the man is instead required to marry his brother's widow so as to "raise up seed to him". Some societies have long practiced sororal polygyny, a form of polygamy in which a man marries multiple wives who are sisters to each other (though not closely related to him).

In Islamic law, marriage among close blood relations like parents, stepparent, parents in-law, siblings, stepsiblings, the children of siblings, aunts and uncles is forbidden, while first or second cousins may marry. Marrying the widow of a brother, or the sister of deceased or divorced wife is also allowed.

Inbreeding

Offspring of biologically related parents are subject to the possible impact of inbreeding. Such offspring have a higher possibility of congenital birth defects (see Coefficient of relationship), because it increases the proportion of zygotes that are homozygous for deleterious recessive alleles that produce such disorders (see Inbreeding depression). Because most such alleles are rare in populations, it is unlikely that two unrelated marriage partners will both be heterozygous carriers. However, because close relatives share a large fraction of their alleles, the probability that any such rare deleterious allele present in the common ancestor will be inherited from both related parents is increased dramatically with respect to non-inbred couples. Contrary to common belief, inbreeding does not in itself alter allele frequencies, but rather increases the relative proportion of homozygotes to heterozygotes. This has two contrary effects.
 In the short term, because incestuous reproduction increases zygosity, deleterious recessive alleles will express themselves more frequently, leading to increases in spontaneous abortions of zygotes, perinatal deaths, and postnatal offspring with birth defects.
 In the long run, however, because of this increased exposure of deleterious recessive alleles to natural selection, their frequency decreases more rapidly in inbred population, leading to a "healthier" population (with fewer deleterious recessive alleles).
The closer two persons are related, the higher the zygosity, and thus the more severe the biological costs of inbreeding. This fact likely explains why inbreeding between close relatives, such as siblings, is less common than inbreeding between cousins.

There may also be other deleterious effects besides those caused by recessive diseases. Thus, similar immune systems may be more vulnerable to infectious diseases (see Major histocompatibility complex and sexual selection).

A 1994 study found a mean excess mortality with inbreeding among first cousins of 4.4%. A 2008 study also found decreased lifespan among offspring of first cousins, but no difference between lifespans after the second cousin level. Children of parent-child or sibling-sibling unions are at increased risk compared to cousin-cousin unions. Studies suggest that 20–36% of these children will die or have major disability due to the inbreeding. A study of 29 offspring resulting from brother-sister or father-daughter incest found that 20 had congenital abnormalities, including four directly attributable to autosomal recessive alleles.

Laws

Laws regarding sexual activity between close relatives vary considerably between jurisdictions, and depend on the type of sexual activity and the nature of the family relationship of the parties involved, as well as the age and sex of the parties. Prohibition of incest laws may extend to restrictions on marriage rights, which also vary between jurisdictions. Most jurisdictions prohibit parent-child and sibling marriages, while others also prohibit first-cousin and uncle-niece and aunt-nephew marriages. In most places, incest is illegal, regardless of the ages of the two partners. In other countries, incestuous relationships between consenting adults (with the age varying by location) are permitted, including in the Netherlands, France, Slovenia and Spain. Sweden is the only country that allows marriage between half-siblings and they must seek government counseling before marriage.

While the legality of consensual incest varies by country, sexual assault committed against a relative is seen as a very serious crime. In some legal systems, the fact of a perpetrator being a close relative to the victim constitutes an aggravating circumstance in the case of sexual crimes such as rape and sexual conduct with a minor – this is the case in Romania.

Religious and philosophical views

Jewish

According to the Torah, per Leviticus 18, "the children of Israel"—Israelite men and women alike—are forbidden from sexual relations between people who are "near of kin" (verse 6), who are defined as:
 Children and their mothers (verse 7)
 Siblings and half-siblings (verses 9 and 11). Relationships between these are particularly singled out for a curse in Deuteronomy 27, and they are of the only two kinds of incestuous relationships that are among the particularly singled out relationships—with the other particularly singled out relationships being ones of non-incestuous family betrayal (cf. verse 20) and bestiality (cf. verse 21)
 Grandparents and grandchildren (verse 10)
 Aunts and nephews, uncles and nieces, etc. (verses 12–14). Relationships between these are the second kind of relationships that are particularly singled out for a curse in Deuteronomy 27, and the explicit examples of children-in-law and mothers-in-law (verse 23) serve to remind the Israelites that the parents-in-law are also (or at least should be also) the children-in-laws' aunts and uncles:

And Moses commanded the children of Israel according to the word of the LORD, saying: 'The tribe of the sons of Joseph speaketh right. This is the thing which the LORD hath commanded concerning the daughters of Zelophehad, saying: Let them be married to whom they think best; only into the family of the tribe of their father shall they be married. So shall no inheritance of the children of Israel remove from tribe to tribe; for the children of Israel shall cleave every one to the inheritance of the tribe of his fathers. And every daughter, that possesseth an inheritance in any tribe of the children of Israel, shall be wife unto one of the family of the tribe of her father, that the children of Israel may possess every man the inheritance of his fathers. So shall no inheritance remove from one tribe to another tribe; for the tribes of the children of Israel shall cleave each one to its own inheritance.' Even as the LORD commanded Moses, so did the daughters of Zelophehad. For Mahlah, Tirzah, and Hoglah, and Milcah, and Noah, the daughters of Zelophehad, were married unto their father's brothers' sons.

Incestuous relationships are considered so severe among chillulim HaShem, acts which bring shame to the name of God, as to be, along with the other forbidden relationships that are mentioned in Leviticus 18, punishable by death as specified in Leviticus 20.

In the 4th century BC, the Soferim (scribes) declared that there were relationships within which marriage constituted incest, in addition to those mentioned by the Torah. These additional relationships were termed seconds (Hebrew: sheniyyot), and included the wives of a man's grandfather and grandson. The classical rabbis prohibited marriage between a man and any of these seconds of his, on the basis that doing so would act as a safeguard against infringing the biblical incest rules, although there was inconclusive debate about exactly what the limits should be for the definition of seconds.

Marriages that are forbidden in the Torah (with the exception of uncle-niece marriages) were regarded by the rabbis of the Middle Ages as invalid – as if they had never occurred; any children born to such a couple were regarded as bastards under Jewish law, and the relatives of the spouse were not regarded as forbidden relations for a further marriage. On the other hand, those relationships which were prohibited due to qualifying as seconds, and so forth, were regarded as wicked, but still valid; while they might have pressured such a couple to divorce, any children of the union were still seen as legitimate.

Christian

The New Testament condemns relations between a man, "and his father's wife", 1 Corinthians 5:1-5. It is inevitable for Bible literalists to accept that the first children of Adam and Eve would have been in incestuous relations as we regard it today. However, according to the Bible, God's law which forbids incest had not at that time been given to men, and was delivered to Moses after Adam and Eve were created. Protestant Christians who adopt the Old Testament as part of their rule of faith and practice make a distinction between the ceremonial law, and the moral law given to Moses: with the demands of the ceremonial law being fulfilled by Christ's atoning death. Protestants view Leviticus 18:6-20 as part of the moral law and still being applicable which condemns sexual/marriage relations between a man and his mother, sister, step-sister, step mother (if a man has more than one wife it is forbidden for a son to have relations with or marry any of his father's wives), aunt, granddaughter, or a man's brother's wife. Leviticus 18 goes on to condemn relations between a man and the daughter of a woman he is having relations with, and the sister of a woman he has had sexual relations with while the first sister is still alive.

The Book of Common Prayer of the Anglican Communion allows marriages up to and including first cousins.

The Catholic Church regards incest as a sin against the Sacrament of Matrimony. For the Catholic Church, at the heart of the immorality of incest is the corruption and disordering of proper family relations. These disordered relationships take on a particularly grave and immoral character when it becomes child sexual abuse.

As the Catechism of the Catholic Church says: 2388 Incest designates intimate relations between relatives or in-laws within a degree that prohibits marriage between them. St. Paul stigmatizes this especially grave offense: 'It is actually reported that there is immorality among you...for a man is living with his father's wife....In the name of the Lord Jesus...you are to deliver this man to Satan for the destruction of the flesh....' Incest corrupts family relationships and marks a regression toward animality.

2389 Connected to incest is any sexual abuse perpetrated by adults on children or adolescents entrusted to their care. The offense is compounded by the scandalous harm done to the physical and moral integrity of the young, who will remain scarred by it all their lives; and the violation of responsibility for their upbringing.

Islamic

The Quran gives specific rules regarding incest, which prohibit a man from marrying or having sexual relationships with:

 his father's wife (his mother, or stepmother, his mother-in-law, a woman from whom he has nursed, even the children of this woman),
 either parent's sister (aunt),
 his sister, his half sister, a woman who has nursed from the same woman as he, his sister-in-law (wife's sister) while still married. Half relations are as sacred as are the full relations.
 his niece (child of sibling),
 his daughter, his stepdaughter (if the marriage to her mother had been consummated), his daughter-in-law.

Cousin marriage finds support in Islamic scriptures and is widespread in the Middle East.

Although Islam allows cousin marriage, there are hadiths attributed to Muhammad calling for distance from the marriage of relatives. However, Muslim scholars generally consider these hadiths unreliable.

Zoroastrian

In Ancient Persia, incest between cousins is a blessed virtue although in some sources incest is believed to be related to that of parent-child or brothers-sisters. Under Zoroastrianism royalty, clergy, and commoners practiced incest, though the extent in the latter class was unknown. This tradition was called Xwedodah. The tradition was considered so sacred, that the bodily fluids produced by an incestuous couple were thought to have curative powers. For instance, the Vendidad advised corpse-bearers to purify themselves with a mixture of urine of a married incestuous couple. Friedrich Nietzsche, in his book The Birth of Tragedy, cited that among Zoroastrians a wise priest is born only by Xvaetvadatha.

To what extent Xvaetvadatha was practiced in Sasanian Iran and before, especially outside the royal and noble families ("dynastic incest") and, perhaps, the clergy, and whether practices ascribed to them can be assumed to be characteristic of the general population is not clear. There is a lack of genealogies and census material on the frequency of Xvaetvadatha. Evidence from Dura-Europos, however, combined with that of the Jewish and Christian sources citing actual cases under the Sasanians, strengthen the evidence of the Zoroastrian texts. In the post-Sasanian Zoroastrian literature, Xvaetvadatha is said to refer to marriages between cousins instead, which have always been relatively common. It has been observed that such incestuous acts received a great deal of glorification as a religious practice and, in addition to being condemned by foreigners (though the reliability of these accusations is questionable since accusations of incest were a common way of denigrating other groups), were considered a great challenge by its own proponents, with accounts suggesting that four copulations was deemed a rare achievement worthy of eternal salvation. It has been suggested that because taking up incestuous relations was a great personal challenge, seemingly repugnant even to Zoroastrians of the time, it served as an honest signal of commitment and devotion to religious ideals.

Hindu
Rigveda regards incest to be "evil". Hinduism speaks of incest in abhorrent terms. Hindus believe there are both karmic and practical bad effects of incest and thus practice strict rules of both endogamy and exogamy, in relation to the family tree (gotra) or bloodline (Pravara).
Marriage within the gotra (swagotra marriage) is banned under the rule of exogamy in the traditional matrimonial system. People within the gotra are regarded as kin and marrying such a person would be thought of as incest. Marriage with paternal cousins (a form of parallel-cousin relationship) is strictly prohibited.

Although generally marriages between persons having the same gotra are frowned upon, how this is defined may vary regionally. Depending on culture and caste of the population in the region, marriage may be restricted up to seven generations of gotra of father, mother, and grandmother. In a few rural areas, marriage is banned within same local community.

Stoicism
The founder of Stoicism, Zeno of Citium, stated that incest was permissible in Republic, as did the later prominent Stoic philosopher, Chrysippus. However, Zeno only advocated for incest under unique circumstances, for example procreating with one's ailing mother in order to beget 'glorious' children, thus comforting her. Otherwise, incest is condemned as being contrary to Nature. Zeno further condemns incest from a moral and psychological perspective, considering it to be a sign of Plato's tyrannical soul, defined as a soul that is governed by illimitable desire. He uses Oedipus as a tragic example. Nonetheless, later Stoic disciples by the 1st century BC downplayed the pro-incest advocacy, accusing Zeno of being "young and thoughtless" when he wrote Republic.

Animals

Inbreeding avoidance is rare in animals. North Carolina State University found that bed bugs, in contrast to most other insects, tolerate incest and are able to genetically withstand the effects of inbreeding quite well.

Many species of mammals, including humanity's closest primate relatives, tend to avoid mating with close relatives, especially if there are alternative partners available. However, some chimpanzees have been recorded attempting to mate with their mothers. Male rats have been recorded engaging in mating with their sisters, but they tend to prefer non-related females over their sisters.

Livestock breeders often practice controlled breeding to eliminate undesirable characteristics within a population, which is also coupled with culling of what is considered unfit offspring, especially when trying to establish a new and desirable trait in the stock.

See also

References
Citations

Bibliography

 Bixler, Ray H. (1982) "Comment on the Incidence and Purpose of Royal Sibling Incest," American Ethnologist, 9(3), August, pp. 580–582. 
 Leavitt, G. C. (1990) "Sociobiological explanations of incest avoidance: A critical claim of evidential claims", American Anthropologist, 92: 971–993. 
 
 Sacco, Lynn (2009). Unspeakable: Father–Daughter Incest in American History. Johns Hopkins University Press. 351 
 Indrajit Bandyopadhyay (29 October 2008). "A Study In Folk "Mahabharata": How Balarama Became Abhimanyu's Father-in-law". Epic India: A New Arts & Culture Magazine
 Đõ, Quý Toàn; Iyer, Sriya; Joshi, Shareen (2006). The Economics of Consanguineous Marriages. World Bank, Development Research Group, Poverty Team.
  link pp. 30–31

External links

 
 
 "Incest / Sexual Abuse of Children" by Patricia D. McClendon, MSSW

 
Family law